The covered goods wagons of classes Glrhs Dresden and Gltrhs Dresden were first placed in service in Germany by the Deutsche Reichsbahn-Gesellschaft in 1937. The wartime (Kriegsbauart) wagon, the DRB Glmhs Leipzig, and the wartime passenger wagon, the DRB MCi-43, were based on the Dresden classes.

The springs were attached to their supports by means of rectangular suspension rings. The external sole bars had a strut frame as additional bracing.

The wagons were equipped with a heating pipe and constructed so that they could be converted for use on Russian broad gauge railways.

The wagon was also deployed in a variant with double end-doors, the Gltrhs on which the hand brake had to be omitted. 

After the war these wagons went into the West German Deutsche Bundesbahn as Class Glrhs 33 and East German Deutsche Reichsbahn as Glrhs 12.

References 

Rolling stock of Germany